Veronica McAleer, also known as Veronica Brebner, is an American make-up artist. She was nominated for two Academy Awards in the category Best Makeup and Hairstyling for the films Mrs Brown and Shakespeare in Love.

Selected filmography 
 Mrs Brown (1997; co-nominated with Lisa Westcott and Beverley Binda)
 Shakespeare in Love (1998; co-nominated with Lisa Westcott)

References

External links 

Living people
Year of birth missing (living people)
Place of birth missing (living people)
American make-up artists